KLQR (1510 AM) is an oldies radio station in Larned, Kansas, near Great Bend.

History
The Regional Mexican format began in October 2010. Before this, it was an affiliate of ESPN Radio from the spring of 2008 to 2010; before ESPN, it was an oldies station with the slogan "Music you remember". Before being an oldies station, it was a general talk radio outlet. 

In order to protect clear channel stations WLAC in Nashville, Tennessee and KGA in Spokane, Washington, also at 1510 AM, KLQR must sign off at local sunset every day.

As part of owner Rocking M Media's bankruptcy reorganization, in which 12 stations in Kansas would be auctioned off to new owners, it was announced on October 31, 2022 that Hutchinson-based Ad Astra Per Aspera Broadcasting was the winning bidder for the then-KNNS, KSOB and Salina-based KVOB for $40,000. While the bankruptcy court has approved the purchase, the sale must be filed to the FCC for approval. Ahead of the closure of the sale, Ad Astra Per Aspera applied for a new KLQR call sign for the station, which took effect on March 1, 2023.

On January 2, 2023, KNNS and KZRS flipped to oldies, branded as "Super Hits 107.9 FM and 1510 AM".

References

External links
Rocking M Media Website

LQR
LQR
Oldies radio stations in the United States
Radio stations established in 1964
1964 establishments in Kansas